The 2003 Kansas City mayoral election was held February 25 and March 31, 2003 to elect the mayor of Kansas City, Missouri. It saw the reelection of incumbent mayor Kay Barnes.

Results

Primary

General election

References

2000s in Kansas City, Missouri
2003 Missouri elections
2003 United States mayoral elections
2003
Non-partisan elections